Estadio de Malabo is a multi-purpose stadium in Malabo, Equatorial Guinea.  It is currently used mostly for football matches.

Overview
The stadium holds 15,250 and opened in 2007. It is currently the home ground of the Equatorial Guinea national football team. One of the host stadiums for the 2012 Africa Cup of Nations, it hosted the final of the Women's African Nations Football cup in 2008. Equatoguinean Premier League sides Atlético Malabo, Atlético Semu, Deportivo Unidad, Sony Elá Nguema, The Panthers and Vegetarianos all play their league games at this stadium.

In the original national stadium, on Christmas Eve of 1969, political opponents of President Francisco Macías Nguema were executed by a firing squad in the stadium, while Mary Hopkin's "Those Were the Days" was played on the stadium's speakers.

References

External links

 Pictures at cafe.daum.net/stade
 Pictures of new stadium
 Pictures at fussbastempel
 Stadium pictures at Stadiumguide.com

Football venues in Equatorial Guinea
Athletics (track and field) venues in Equatorial Guinea
Equatorial Guinea
Buildings and structures in Malabo
Multi-purpose stadiums in Equatorial Guinea
2012 Africa Cup of Nations
2015 Africa Cup of Nations
Sports venues completed in 2007